USS Courser (MSC(O)-6/AMS-6/YMS-201) was a  built for the United States Navy during World War II. She was the second ship of the U.S. Navy to be named Courser.

History
Courser was laid down as YMS-201 on 28 August 1942 by the Hiltebrant Dry Dock Co. of Kingston, New York; launched 19 November 1942; and completed 24 July 1943.

On 17 February 1947, YMS-201 was reclassified as AMS-6, and named Courser the following day.

Courser was reclassified MSC(O)-6 on 7 February 1955.

Courser was struck from the Naval Vessel Register on 1 November 1959. Her ultimate fate is unknown.

References

External links 
 

YMS-1-class minesweepers of the United States Navy
Ships built in Kingston, New York
1942 ships
World War II minesweepers of the United States